Christmas on a Rational Planet is an original novel written by Lawrence Miles and based on the long-running British science fiction television series Doctor Who. It features the Seventh Doctor, Chris and Roz.

It also contains the first casual reference to the Faction Paradox, which become an important element in the BBC books Eighth Doctor Adventures and subsequent spin-off series, and an explicit explanation that the mark carried by the Third Doctor during his exile on Earth was a branding used to distinguish criminals by the Time Lords (in reality, this mark was a tattoo of a cobra that Jon Pertwee picked up while serving in the Royal Navy).

Summary
'An end to history. An end to certainty. Is that too much to ask?'

December, 1799. Europe is recovering from the Age of Reason, the Vatican is learning to live with Napoleon, and America is celebrating a new era of independence. But in New York State, something is spreading its own brand of madness through the streets. Secret societies are crawling from the woodwork, and there's a Satanic conspiracy around every corner.

Roz Forrester is stranded in a town where festive cheer and random violence go hand-in-hand. Chris Cwej is trapped on board the TARDIS with someone who's been trained to kill him. And when Reason itself breaks down, even the Doctor can't be sure who or what he's fighting for.

Christmas is coming to town, and the end of civilization is following close behind...

External links

1996 British novels
1996 science fiction novels
Virgin New Adventures
Novels by Lawrence Miles
Seventh Doctor novels
Fiction set in 1799
Fiction set in 2012